Colonel Philip Howard (5 March 1629 – September 1717) was a British soldier and politician, the seventh son of Thomas Howard, 1st Earl of Berkshire.

Howard served as Member of Parliament for Malmesbury from 1662 to 1679 and Westminster from 1689 to 1690. In 1697 he was Colonel of the Red Regiment of Westminster  Militia.

He married the heiress Mary Jennings, who brought a considerable estate to his descendants. They had two sons:
 James Howard (1679–1722), married Catherine Booth and had four children:
 Catherine Elizabeth Howard (1700–1775), married Narcissus Proby in 1734
 William Howard, (1701–1701) died aged 4 months
 James Thomas Howard, (1703–1706) died aged two years
 Martha Maria Howard (1707–1797), married Hon. Rev. Charles Hervey, son of John Hervey, 1st Earl of Bristol, died without issue
 Cmdr. Charles Howard (1681–1707), lost with HMS Swan, married Elizabeth Batten (d. June 1711) and had two children:
 Capt. Philip Howard (1704–1741), married Margaret Skreen, father of John Howard, 15th Earl of Suffolk
 Mary Howard (d. 1744), married Henry Scott, 1st Earl of Deloraine (d. 1730) in 1726, by whom she had two children; married William Windham in April 1734, without issue

References

1629 births
1717 deaths
English army officers
Younger sons of earls
Philip Howard
17th-century soldiers
Middlesex Militia officers
English MPs 1661–1679
English MPs 1689–1690